HMCS Esquimalt was a  that served in the Royal Canadian Navy during the Second World War. She saw service in the Battle of the Atlantic and in the Battle of the St. Lawrence. She was sunk in 1945, the last Canadian warship to suffer that fate. She was named for Esquimalt, British Columbia.

Design and description
However, due to the difficulty procuring diesel engines led to the small number of the diesel version being completed. The ships displaced  standard and  fully loaded. However, the size of the ship led to criticisms of their being too cramped for magnetic or acoustic minesweeping gear. This may have been due to all the additions made during the war with the installation of ASDIC, radar and depth charges.

The Bangor class came in two versions. Esquimalt was of the diesel-powered version, being equipped with a 9-cylinder diesel engine driving two shafts that produced . The vessels carried  of oil. The vessels had a complement of 6 officers and 77 ratings.

The Canadian diesel-powered Bangors were armed with a single quick-firing (QF) 12-pounder 12 cwt gun mounted forward. Initially the design called for a  gun, however these were replaced with 12-pounder guns. The ships were also fitted with a QF 2-pounder Mark VIII gun aft and were eventually fitted with single-mounted QF 20 mm Oerlikon guns on the bridge wings. For those ships assigned to convoy duty, they were armed with two depth charge launchers and two chutes to deploy the 40 depth charges they carried.

Service history
Esquimalt was ordered as part of the 1940–41 building programme. The minesweeper's keel was laid down on 20 December 1940 by Marine Industries Ltd. at Sorel, Quebec. The ship was launched on 8 August 1941 and was commissioned into the Royal Canadian Navy on 26 October 1942 at Sorel with the pennant number J272.

After arriving at Halifax in November 1942, Esquimalt required constant attention by the dockyard as the vessel had a series of mechanical problems, undergoing two periods of repair in March and May 1943. She was then assigned to Newfoundland Force for local patrol duties. In September 1944 she transferred to the Halifax Local Defence Force.

Late that month, Esquimalt underwent a three-month refit at Halifax. She returned to duty with the Halifax Local Defence Force and remained with them until 16 April 1945.

Last patrol 

In the early morning of 16 April she was attacked by U-190, a German U-boat that had been operating around Halifax since early April. U-190s torpedo struck Esquimalts starboard side engine room with the explosion knocking out the onboard power instantly, preventing any distress signal being sent. She started to list heavily to starboard pushing the lifeboat under water, but the crew managed to get four Carley floats clear of the ship. Esquimalt sank in less than five minutes. Because of the lack of distress calls or signals from Esquimalt, and the unfortunate timing of the attack itself, any rescue effort was substantially delayed which resulted in many men losing their lives to exposure. The crew was adrift on the Carley floats in frigid waters with only light clothing for about six hours. Thirty-nine men died as a result of the attack and the exposure that followed. The remaining crew members were rescued with the arrival of Sarnia, who unsuccessfully attacked U-190 after making contact with the submarine. Two Fairmile B motor launches later sent to patrol the area of the sinking depth charged the wreck of Esquimalt, mistakenly believing it to be a submarine.

See also
 List of ships of the Canadian Navy
 History of the Royal Canadian Navy

References

Notes

Citations

Sources

External links

 Naval History.ca
 Haze Gray and Underway
 ReadyAyeReady.com
 List of casualties
 

Bangor-class minesweepers of the Royal Canadian Navy
Ships built in Quebec
1941 ships
World War II minesweepers of Canada
Ships sunk by German submarines in World War II
World War II shipwrecks in the Atlantic Ocean
Maritime incidents in April 1945